Togrul is a male name, used mainly in Turkey (Tuğrul) and Azerbaijan (Toğrul), and may refer to:
Tugrul, Seljuk ruler
Tugrul III, Seljuk ruler
Togrul Narimanbekov, Azeri painter

See also
Tugrul
Turul